Dulcy is a 1940 American comedy film, based upon the 1921 play written by directed by George S. Kaufman and Marc Connelly. It was directed by S. Sylvan Simon for  Metro-Goldwyn-Mayer and stars  Ann Sothern, Ian Hunter, and Roland Young .

Plot
Bill Ward wants to marry wealthy Angela Forbes and goes to the pier to meet her parents' cruise ship when it arrives. Bill's sister Dulcy goes along, but rather than greet the Forbeses, she becomes distracted by arriving passenger Gordon Daly.

Dulcy has a habit of doing the wrong thing. When she learns that Gordon has invented a new airplane motor and needs to raise capital, she invites him to meet Roger Forbes, father of her brother's fiancée. Then she makes a mistake during Gordon's presentation that causes the motor to spit oil in Mr. Forbes's face. He leaves in a huff.

Bill and Angela decide to elope. Dulcy introduces them to a man she's just met, Schuyler Van Dyke, who offers to fund Gordon's enterprise. All is well until Dulcy learns that Van Dyke is actually a man named Patterson who suffers from delusions of grandeur. Luckily for all, Roger Forbes returns and outbids Van Dyke for the invention, making Dulcy an accidental hero.

Cast

References

External links
Dulcy (1940 film) at the Internet Movie Database

1940 films
1940 comedy films
American black-and-white films
American comedy films
1940s English-language films
American films based on plays
Films directed by S. Sylvan Simon
Films scored by Bronisław Kaper
Metro-Goldwyn-Mayer films
1940s American films